Eldad and Medad are mentioned in the Book of Numbers, and are described as having prophesied among the Israelites, despite the fact that they had remained in the camp, while 70 elders had gone to the tabernacle outside the camp to receive the ability to prophesy from God. According to the narrative, Joshua asked Moses to forbid Eldad and Medad from prophecy, but Moses argued that it was a good thing that others could prophesy, and that ideally all the Israelites would prophesy.

In rabbinical tradition, Eldad and Medad are said to have predicted a war with Gog and Magog, with the king from Magog uniting the non-Jews and launching war in Israel against the Jews, but these non-Jews being defeated and slain by fire from the Throne of God. Some classical rabbinical literature argues that the non-Jews would be at the mercy of the Jewish Messiah; such Messianic connections of Eldad and Medad also circulated among early Christian groups, and a particularly popular discussion of such prophecy was even quoted in the apocryphal Shepherd of Hermas.

The unique Greek quotation is in the Visions of The Shepherd of Hermas 2.3.4, which Latin, Ethiopic, and Coptic versions are derived from.

According to biblical scholars, the real purpose of the story was to indicate that prophecy was not restricted to a select few people. However, the text states that Eldad and Medad "were of them that were written down", making them less representative of the general population, although some textual scholars believe that this is a gloss added to the original Elohist account, by a later editor who objected to the idea that anyone could become a prophet.
if the names are Hebrew, then  could mean 'paternal uncle', with  thus meaning 'God is the brother of my father' or 'El is the brother of my father', and  meaning '(one who is) of my father's brother'
Joshua Gettinger, ba'al keriyah and Author of "Sound and Scripture" recently offered an alternative suggestion.  Eldad and Medad are likely onomatopoeias (similar to John Doe, or "ploni almoni".  It is rare for the Hebrew Scripture not to include full names ("so and so, son of so and so").  The notion that the two figures are essentially anonymous is in accord with Moses' concluding sentiments: "If only all God's people were prophets, that God would give His spirit on them!"

According to Jewish tradition, Eldad and Medad were buried in the same cave in Edrei.

Notes and citations

Book of Numbers people
Mythological duos